The San Luis Open Challenger Tour is a professional tennis tournament played on outdoor red clay courts. It is currently part of the Association of Tennis Professionals (ATP) Challenger Tour and 125 Challenger series of the WTA Tour. It is organized annually in San Luis Potosí, Mexico, since 1984 and was previously also held in 1980 and 1981 too. The women's edition started in 2023.

Fernando Vicente and Dick Norman holds the most singles title won, two.

Leonardo Lavalle established the record on doubles titles, with four win. He partnered every time with a different player each of this time. He hold along with Miguel Ángel Reyes-Varela the record of consecutive victories, three.

Leonardo Lavalle, Dick Norman and Marcelo Arévalo were the only players to win both singles and doubles titles the same year.

Past finals

Singles

Doubles

References

External links
Official website
ITF Search

ATP Challenger Tour
Challenger tennis tournaments
Clay court tennis tournaments
Tennis tournaments in Mexico
San Luis Potosí Challenger